Etta James (also known as Only a Fool) is the tenth studio album by American blues artist Etta James, released in 1973.

Reception
The Allmusic review awarded the album 3½ stars stating "A mixture of funk and blues-rock, the new direction turned out dark and brooding...  The reinvented James went over well with the public. The album garnered good sales and was even nominated for an Grammy Award".

The album reached peak positions of number 154 on the US Billboard 200 and number 41 on the Billboard R&B chart.

Track listing

Personnel
Etta James - vocals
Ken Marco - guitar
Chuck Rainey - bass
William "Smitty" Smith - keyboards
Kenny "Spider Webb" Rice - drums
King Errisson - percussion, congas
Trevor Lawrence - horn arrangements
Jimmie Haskell - string arrangements

References

1973 albums
Etta James albums
Albums arranged by Jimmie Haskell
Albums produced by Gabriel Mekler
Chess Records albums